Michael Hurley (born 22 March 1996) is an Irish Gaelic footballer who plays for Premier Senior Championship club Castlehaven and at inter-county level with the Cork senior football team. He usually lines out as a corner forward.

Honours

Castlehaven
Cork Senior Football Championship (1): 2013

Cork
National Football League Division 3 (1): 2020
Munster Under-21 Football Championship (1): 2016

References

External link
Michael Hurley profile at the Cork GAA website

1996 births
Living people
Castlehaven Gaelic footballers
Cork inter-county Gaelic footballers